The Deputy Speaker of the House of the Representatives of Malta acts as a deputy to the Speaker. Whenever the Speaker is absent from the House. It is the Deputy Speaker that assumes the role of Acting Speaker. Unlike the Speaker, the Deputy Speaker can only be appointed from inside the House and he does not lose his original vote even when he is Acting Speaker.

The Deputy Speaker acts as the Chairperson of Committees when the House is resolved into a Committee stage. Such is the case for instance, in the General Estimates Bill, when the House resolves itself into a Committee of Supply.

Speakers of the House of Representatives of Malta
Legislative deputy speakers